Abraham Byrd House is a historic home located at Jackson, Cape Girardeau County, Missouri.  It was built in 1827, and is a two-story, vernacular I-house constructed with rough-cut limestone blocks. It has a one-story addition and a two-story service wing.  It sits on a rough-cut limestone foundation.  Located at the rear of the house is the foundation remains of the kitchen.

It was listed on the National Register of Historic Places in 2007.

References

Houses on the National Register of Historic Places in Missouri
Houses completed in 1827
Houses in Cape Girardeau County, Missouri
National Register of Historic Places in Cape Girardeau County, Missouri
1827 establishments in Missouri